Bolton Lake is a lake in the Hayes River drainage basin in Census Division No. 22 - Thompson-North Central, Northern Region, Manitoba, Canada. The primary inflows are the Bolton River from the west and the Nikik River from the south, and the primary outflow is Bolton River, whose waters eventually flow into Gods Lake, and via the Gods River and the Hayes River into Hudson Bay.

References

Lakes of Manitoba